James Francis Thaddeus O'Connor (November 10, 1886 – September 28, 1949) was a United States district judge of the United States District Court for the Southern District of California.

Education and career

Born in Grand Forks, Dakota Territory (now North Dakota), O'Connor received an Artium Baccalaureus degree from the University of North Dakota in 1907, a Bachelor of Laws from the University of North Dakota School of Law in 1908, a Bachelor of Laws from Yale Law School in 1909, and a Master of Arts degree from Yale University in 1910. He was an Instructor of Rhetoric at Yale University from 1909 to 1912. He was in private practice in Grand Forks from 1912 to 1925, and in Los Angeles, California from 1925 to 1933. He served as Comptroller of the Currency in the United States Department of the Treasury from May 11, 1933 to April 16, 1938.

O'Connor also served in the North Dakota Legislature. He served in the North Dakota House of Representatives from 1917 to 1920. In the 1920 gubernatorial election, O'Connor ran unsuccessfully against incumbent Lynn Frazier.

Federal judicial service

O'Connor was nominated by President Franklin D. Roosevelt on August 28, 1940, to a seat on the United States District Court for the Southern District of California vacated by Judge William P. James. He was confirmed by the United States Senate on September 19, 1940, and received his commission on September 27, 1940. His service terminated on September 28, 1949, due to his death in Los Angeles.

References

Sources

External links

Guide to the James Francis Thaddeus O'Connor Papers at The Bancroft Library

|-

|-

1886 births
1949 deaths
20th-century American judges
Comptrollers in the United States
Franklin D. Roosevelt administration personnel
Judges of the United States District Court for the Southern District of California
United States Comptrollers of the Currency
United States district court judges appointed by Franklin D. Roosevelt